"Let Me Live" is a 1996 song by Queen, from the album Made in Heaven. Freddie Mercury, Roger Taylor and Brian May share lead vocals, with Mercury singing the first verse, Taylor singing the second verse & bridge, and May singing the last verse. During the choruses, all of the band members sing (except for John Deacon), as well as a background choir, giving it a gospel sound reminiscent of the band's 1976 single "Somebody to Love". The single reached No. 9 in the UK Single Charts, becoming the band's last top ten hit in that country.

History
Freddie Mercury stated in an interview that this song was originally recorded with Rod Stewart in 1983. It is rumoured that this song was intended to be on Queen's The Works album in 1984. Some backing lyrics in the version intended for release on Made in Heaven had to be changed due to copyright problems, because it resembled a line from "Piece of My Heart". The first Mexican and Dutch pressings of the album, however, had the original version. The song peaked at No. 9 on the UK singles chart. According to the Queen website, BBC Radio 1 banned this song from the air waves.

Track listing

Personnel

Queen
Freddie Mercury — lead vocals on first verse, piano
Brian May — lead vocals on final verse, backing vocals, electric guitar, organ
Roger Taylor — lead vocals on second verse and bridge, backing vocals, drums, percussion
John Deacon — bass guitar

Additional musicians
Rebecca Leigh-White – backing vocals
Gary Martin – backing vocals
Catherine Porter — backing vocals
Miriam Stockley — backing vocals

Alternate version
Made in Heaven – The Film's Edit (0:29) (on the DVD only, on the 'Song Select' screen) (an edit of the album version from 0:25 to 0:55, fading out over three seconds)

Charts

References

External links
 
 Lyrics at Queen official website

Queen (band) songs
1996 singles
Parlophone singles
Rock ballads
Songs written by Brian May
Songs written by John Deacon
Songs written by Roger Taylor (Queen drummer)
Songs written by Freddie Mercury
Songs released posthumously
Hollywood Records singles
Gospel songs
1995 songs